This is a list of Hungarian football transfers for the 2011 summer transfer window by club. Only transfers of clubs in the OTP Bank Liga are included.

The summer transfer window opened on 1 June 2011, although a few transfers may have taken place prior to that date. The window closed at midnight on 31 August 2011. Players without a club may join one at any time, either during or in between transfer windows.

OTP Bank Liga

BFC Siófok

In:

Out:

Budapest Honvéd FC

In:

Out:

Debreceni VSC

In:

Out:

Ferencvárosi TC

In:

Out:

Győri ETO FC

In:

Out:

Kaposvári Rákóczi FC

In:

Out:

Kecskeméti TE

In:

Out:

Lombard-Pápa TFC

In:

Out:

Paksi SE

In:

Out:

Pécsi Mecsek FC

In:

Out:

Szombathelyi Haladás

In:

Out:

Újpest FC

In:

Out:

Vasas SC

In:

Out:

Videoton FC

In:

Out:

Zalaegerszegi TE

In:

Out:

References

External links
Nemzeti Sport 
Pepsifoci 

Hungarian
Transfers summer
2011